Lexiphanes is a genus of case-bearing leaf beetles in the family Chrysomelidae. There are about 17 described species in Lexiphanes.

Species
These 17 species belong to the genus Lexiphanes:

 Lexiphanes abdomialis Jacoby
 Lexiphanes affinis (Haldeman, 1849)
 Lexiphanes atrofasciatus Jacoby
 Lexiphanes decolorans Suffrian, 1863
 Lexiphanes flavitarsis Jacoby
 Lexiphanes guerini (Perbosc, 1839)
 Lexiphanes juvencus Olivier, 1808
 Lexiphanes mexicanus (Jacoby, 1907)
 Lexiphanes nigripennis Jacoby
 Lexiphanes saponatus (Fabricius, 1801)
 Lexiphanes scrobiculatus Suffrian, 1863
 Lexiphanes seminulum (Suffrian, 1858)
 Lexiphanes seriepunctatus Suffrian, 1863
 Lexiphanes simplex (Jacoby, 1889)
 Lexiphanes stricticollis Suffrian, 1863
 Lexiphanes teapensis (Jacoby, 1889)
 Lexiphanes umbrosus Suffrian, 1863

References

Further reading

 
 

Cryptocephalinae
Articles created by Qbugbot
Chrysomelidae genera